María Verónica Vargas Granja (1989) is an Ecuadorian model and beauty pageant titleholder who was crowned Miss World Ecuador 2011 and will represent her country in the 2011 Miss World pageant.

Early life
Vargas is taking a bachelor's degree in journalist at Universidad de Eloy Alfaro de Manta and speaks Spanish and English. She  enjoys reading and she was Nereida de la Armada del Ecuador.

Miss Ecuador 2011 

Miss World 2011
As the official representative of her country to the 2011 Miss World pageant, Verónica will vie to succeed current Miss World titleholder, Alexandria Mills of United States.

References

External links
Official Miss Ecuador website

1989 births
Living people
Ecuadorian beauty pageant winners
Miss World 2011 delegates
People from Guayaquil